Minbu District is a district of the Magway Division in central Myanmar. The city of Minbu is the administrative centre. Minbu District has 5 townships.

List of city and towns by urban population

Borders
Minbu District is bounded to the south by Thayet District, to the east by Magway District, to the north by Pakokku Districtl, to the northwest by Mindat District of Chin State, and to the west by Sittwe District of Rakhine State and Kyaukpyu District of Rakhine State.

Townships
The district contains the following townships:
Minbu Township
Pwintbyu Township
Ngape Township
Salin Township
Sidoktaya Township

Notes

External links
"Minbu (Sagu) Google Satellite Map and Gazetteer" Maplandia

Districts of Myanmar
Magway Region